Arameisk-Syrianska IF is a Swedish based football club in Botkyrka, a suburb of Stockholm. The club was formed as Arameiska-Syrianska KIF by Syriacs (Arameans) in 1980 and has advanced through the league system, currently (2017) playing in the third highest Swedish league, Division 1. In 2008, the club used the name Syrianska Botkyrka IF after having concluded a cooperation with Botkyrka municipality in early 2008. The club has previously been called Arameiska-Syrianska KIF and Syrianska Botkyrka IF, but is now known as Arameisk-Syrianska IF.

Season to season

Current squad

Attendances

In recent seasons Arameiska-Syrianska IF have had the following average attendances:

* Attendances are provided in the Publikliga sections of the Svenska Fotbollförbundet website. 
|}

See also
Assyriska FF
Syrianska FC
List of Assyrian-Syriac football teams in Sweden

References

External links
 Official website
 Arameiska/Syrianska KIF Facebook

 
Assyrian football clubs
Assyrian/Syriac football clubs in Sweden
Football clubs in Stockholm County
Association football clubs established in 1980
Sport in Stockholm County
1980 establishments in Sweden
Diaspora sports clubs